Khanpur Tehsil is a Tehsil and one of the 44 union councils of Haripur District in the Khyber Pakhtunkhwa province of Pakistan, the mayor of khanpur Tehsil is Raja Haroon Sikandar grandson of Former chief minister of Khyber Pakhtunkhwa Raja Sikandar Zaman.￼Khanpur Dam is located near Khanpur Town. It is located to the south of the district capital Haripur.

References

Union councils of Haripur District
Cities in Khyber Pakhtunkhwa